The Rock Super Bowl was a recurring rock festival held from 1977 to 1983 at the Tangerine Bowl in Orlando, Florida. The festival hosted artists such as Aerosmith, Van Halen, Ted Nugent, Fleetwood Mac, Foreigner, Peter Frampton, Heart, ZZ Top, REO Speedwagon, Bryan Adams, Foghat, and Blue Öyster Cult.

References

Music festivals established in 1977
Rock festivals in the United States